Robert Neil Quarry (born November 20, 1962), known as Bobby Quarry, is a former boxer and the youngest brother of Jerry and Mike Quarry.

Bobby Quarry was born in Lynwood, California, and is the last surviving brother of the four Quarry brothers, three of whom were noted boxers.

He began boxing professionally in 1982. Bobby Quarry's biggest bout was in the early 1990s, when he faced Tommy Morrison in a Las Vegas match that was televised on ESPN. Quarry was cut on the chin and knocked out by a Morrison right hand at 1:34 of the second round, the count reaching three with Quarry on his back before referee Richard Steele called a halt to the contest. Bobby had hoped to upset Morrison, as the fight was Morrison's first comeback bout after getting knocked out by WBO heavyweight champion Ray Mercer less than four months earlier. Bobby carelessly dropped his guard, and Morrison took advantage and knocked him out with a free head  In contrast to his brothers, Bobby did not enjoy much success in the ring - his career professional boxing record was 10-12-2. He won only one of his last nine bouts, a televised victory over Dave Kilgour. The win was a poorly engineered TV mismatch with Quarry weight 222 1/2 and Kilgour 194. Kilgour would be, in fact a cruiserweight, a lower division, in modern boxing, but at the time, boxers that weighted over 190 pounds were considered Heavyweights. After consecutive knockout losses to David Dixon, Rocky Pepeli, the loss to future world champion Tommy Morrison (on ESPN in Las Vegas), and Jimmy Ellis Jr., Bobby was retired due to his deteriorating state at age 29.

Quarry later returned to school with the goal of becoming a sports reporter, and had a brief television career as a sports commentator and reporter. He subsequently did time for grand theft at Folsom Prison for possession of stolen property, from which he had to be released on furlough to attend his brother Mike Quarry's funeral where he is seen in the local paper with 5-year-old son Sam Quarry.

Legacy
As Bobby was the least popular of the fighting Quarry brothers, not many of his professional bouts were either seen by the general public or even filmed. Two televised rare Bobby Quarry bouts can still be found online, though.

 Tommy Morrison versus Bobby Quarry heavyweight bout, Las Vegas, Nevada, February 16, 1992, Quarry lost in second round 
 David Kilgour versus Bobby Quarry heavyweight bout, Inglewood, California, January 28, 1991. Quarry won in third round  click on video on left. Requires RealPlayer software.

External links
 
 Bobby Quarry photo gallery on BoxRec

References

External links
 Robert Quarry page on the Jerry Quarry Foundation site

Boxers from California
1962 births
Living people
American male boxers
Heavyweight boxers